Susan Caroline Kippax  (born 1941) is an Australian social psychologist and is Emeritus Professor at the University of New South Wales.

Academic career 
Born in 1941, Kippax graduated from the University of Sydney with a BA (1968).  In 1970 she won a Rhodes Scholarship to study at the University of Oxford. She completed her PhD (1972) at the University of Sydney. Her thesis was titled Attitudes: A theory and experimental investigation of their complex nature.

In 1973 Kippax joined the Department of Psychology at Macquarie University where she helped establish the National Centre in HIV Social Research (NCHIVSR) in 1995. In 1999 she and the NCHIVSR moved to the University of New South Wales. She was appointed Emeritus Professor in 2008.

In 1999 Kippax was one of four Founding Editors of Culture, Health & Sexuality, the journal of the International Association for the Study of Sexuality, Culture and Society. She was co-Editor-in-Chief of the Journal of the International Aids Society for ten years, retiring in July 2019.

Honours and recognition 
Kippax was elected Fellow of the Academy of the Social Sciences in Australia in 2000.

She was appointed an Officer of the Order of Australia in the 2019 Queen's Birthday Honours for "distinguished service to higher education, and to community health, particularly through research into HIV prevention and treatment".

Selected works

Books

Articles

References 

1941 births
Living people
Officers of the Order of Australia
Fellows of the Academy of the Social Sciences in Australia
University of Sydney alumni
Academic staff of the University of New South Wales
Social psychologists
Australian Rhodes Scholars